HSwMS Älvsborg (M02) was a minelayer in the Swedish Navy, launched on 11 November 1969. She had one sister ship, . She belonged to the 1st Submarine Flotilla and served as leader of the division. In 1997, Älvsborg was sold to Chile and was renamed Almirante José Toribio Merino Castro. She was taken out of service on 15 January 2015.

References

Bibliography

1969 ships
Mine warfare vessels of the Swedish Navy
Ships of the Chilean Navy
Ships built in Sweden